La baby sister is a telenovela Colombian made by Teleset for the Canal Caracol in the year 2000. Its protagonists were Paola Rey and Víctor Mallarino and as antagonists Marcela Gallego and Manuela González.

The recordings of the telenovela began on June 12, 2000 and ended on January 26, 2001, and it premiered on September 25, 2000.

Plot summary 
Daniel Luna and his wife Martha Parejo (played by Marcela Gallego) are a successful and semi-famous couple living among Bogota's upper crust society.  They work in the same office, where Martha is a celebrity marriage counselor/television personality (much like Dr. Phil in America), and Daniel is a lawyer and professor specializing in divorce law.  In the opening episode, Martha is about to release her newest book, which is an exaltation of her ostensibly perfect marriage.  Martha's reputation as a counselor is built on honest and straightforward communication between couples.  In one chapter of her book— a chapter highlighted by the book's publisher— Martha states that Daniel was often sexually inadequate, but that they have managed to overcome his inadequacies and build a successful marriage based on trust and honesty.  However, both trust and honesty crumble for the celebrity couple when Daniel, who has not yet read Martha's newest book, discovers that the entire nation of Colombia believes he is sexually inadequate, which (the directors of the novela imply through various sex scenes) is not true.

Martha's book release has a pernicious effect on their marriage, which begins to crumble after Martha finds out that Daniel had a brief sexual encounter with one of his students, Veronica Davila (played by Manuela Gonzalez), who is infatuated with Daniel and who, as the viewers gradually find out, is insane.

During the same time period, the Lunas have hired Fabiana Rivera (played by Paola Rey), a beautiful twenty-one-year-old college student, to help them take care of their two children.  Fabiana is from a lower-class family, and she is dazzled by the Luna's rich style of living and by the charm of her new boss, Daniel.  As Martha and Daniel's relationship continues to deteriorate, the two decide to separate, and Daniel increasingly comes to rely on Fabiana to help him cope with raising his children while separating from his wife.  Fabiana and Daniel fall in love, and after sharing various furtive kisses (accompanied by feelings of guilt and confusion), they culminate their romance sexually in a hotel.

Fabiana and Daniel make plans to run away together, but their plans are shattered when Martha, distraught because her separation from Daniel has become a national scandal fueled by the gossip driven media, accidentally overdoses on anti-depressants.  Daniel mistakenly believes that his wife tried to commit suicide, and Martha does nothing to disabuse him of the belief in hopes that his feelings of guilt will help save their marriage.

The sexual consummation between Fabiana and Daniel, followed almost immediately by Martha's overdose, takes place during the first third of the novela's 160 episodes, and the rest of the narrative arch involves Daniel struggling between his love for Fabiana and the desire not to hurt his family, and Fabiana's doomed attempts to forget about Daniel.  Fabiana continues to work in the Luna household for a time (where she continues to have brief romantic encounters with Daniel), but she leaves after Martha discovers that she and Daniel slept together.  Fabiana and Daniel separate, and Fabiana briefly gets engaged to her childhood friend, Edwin Paipa (played by Luis Fernando Salis).  But neither she nor Daniel can overcome their illicit love for one another.  In the end, the two protagonists cast aside social restrictions against their relationship and the objections of their respective friends and families, and get married.

Social Class in La Baby Sister

Although much of the La Baby Sister involves either stereotypical romantic themes or silly comical hijinks, the novela does delve into some pertinent social commentary, most notably involving social class.

A recurring theme in La Baby Sister is the difference in class between Fabiana and Daniel and their respective families.  Most characters, including Fabiana herself at one point, assume that Daniel cannot possibly love Fabiana because she is of a lower social class.  Indeed, Daniel says as much to Veronica while trying to deny that he and Fabiana had an affair.  Moreover, Martha appears (unrealistically) blind to the affair between Fabiana and Daniel because she assumes that Daniel would never "sink so low" as to have an affair with hired help, or at least not an affair that would mean anything.  Throughout the novela, Martha repeatedly tries to instill class-based discrimination in the education of her children.  At one point she, apparently without irony, alludes to George Orwell's Animal Farm by saying to her daughter, "All people are equal, but some people are more equal than others."

The producers of the novela clearly come down on the progressive side of the class debate: with the exception of Daniel, every upper-class character is stereotyped as snobbish, greedy, insane, or all three.  One of the Novela's primary villains, Veronica, continually evokes her membership in the upper-class as justification for her unsavory and occasionally violent actions.  In contrast, the Fabiana's working-class family and neighbors are consistently portrayed sympathetically as hard-working people who want nothing more than happiness for everyone, regardless of their social position.  The novela also repeatedly portrays class-mobility in Colombia as difficult at best: Fabiana repeatedly tries to enter with Colombia's upper-class and is repeatedly buffeted by discrimination by her social "betters."  In the final episodes, Daniel realizes that in order to be with Fabiana, he must renounce background in and cut his ties with Bogota's high society, a decision that allows him to be with his love, but which also costs him a lucrative career.  The Novela's resolution suggests that, however unjust it may be, class discrimination is as strong as ever in Colombia.

Success and Availability of La Baby Sister 

La Baby Sister aired successfully in several Latin American countries.  It enjoyed a successful run in America as well, though it seems unlikely that Telemundo, or any other network, will air the series again.  It is, however, available for sale on the internet in the form of unauthorized DVDs, an illicit market that gives many telenovelas a second life after their initial broadcasts.  Many of the actors in the novella continued to work together on other projects following La Baby Sister, and the main star, Paola Rey, starred in three more telenovelas broadcasts on Telemundo, including La mujer en el espejo, Amores de mercado, and Pasion de Gavilanes.

Cast 
 Paola Rey ... Fabiana Rivera
 Víctor Mallarino ... Daniel Luna
 Marcela Gallego ... Marta Parejo 
 Víctor Hugo Cabrera ... Reinaldo 
 Nórida Rodríguez ... Leticia 
 Patricia Grisales ... Roselia de Rivera 
 Hugo Gómez ... Fidel Rivera
 Astrid Hernández ... Angie
 Sebastián Sánchez ... Giovanny Rivera
 Cecilia Navia ... Pili Guaquetá
 Manuela González ... Verónica Dávila
 Carolina Sarmiento .... Mireya
 Andrés Felipe Martínez ... Jorge Camargo 
 Ernesto Benjumea ... Roberto Villa
 Alberto Saavedra ... Mr. Paipa
 Luis Fernando Salas ... Edwin Paipa
 María Margarita Giraldo ... Ofelia
 Manuel Busquets ... Manuel Parejo
 Isabel Campos ... Elena de Parejo
 Manuela Bolívar ... Valentina Luna
 Jeofrey Roffell ... Vicente Luna
 Ana María Abello ... Catalina 'Cata' 
 Darío Acosta ... Kendall 
 Félix Antequera ... Johnny 
 Anderson Balsero ... Comanche 
 Saín Castro ... Emiliano Rivera 
 Maurizio Konde ... Driver 
 Humberto Dorado ... Dr. Vargas 
 Tita Duarte ... Mrs. Paipa 
 Raúl Gutiérrez ... Dr. Acuña, abogado 
 Mauricio Figueroa ... Omar 'The Enlightened' 
 Diana Hare ... Inés 
 Flavio León 
 Ramiro Meneses ... José Gabriel 
 Alejandra Miranda ... Isabel 
 Angelly Moncayo ... Sofía Pelvis 
 Edgardo Román ... Dr. Andrés Posada 
 Juan David Sánchez ... Chachán Rivera 
 Adriana Vera ... Dr. Luisa
 Adrian Sayari Sanchez Coccaro ... Watchman

Technical sheet 

 General Production: Juana Uribe
 Address: Andrés Marroquín / Juan Pablo Posada
 Original Idea: Juana Uribe
 Scripts: Ana María Londoño / Jörg Hiller / Camila Misas
 Executive Production: Andrés Posada
 Director of Photography: Javier Garzón / Rafael Puentes
 Art Direction: German Lizarralde / Diego Guarnizo / Felipe Sánchez
 Edition: Isabel Cristina Méndez / Marcela Vásquez / Rafael Pinaud
 Casting: Liliana García
 Original Music: Nicolas Uribe

External links 
 Official Site 
 Colarte
 
 https://archive.today/20121202040921/http://foro.telenovela-world.com/~diane/babysister/Summary.HTM
 https://web.archive.org/web/20051217165724/http://foro.telenovela-world.com/n4/read-t.php?f=83&i=9447&t=9447

2000 telenovelas
Colombian telenovelas
Caracol Televisión telenovelas
Television series by Teleset
2000 Colombian television series debuts
2001 Colombian television series endings
Spanish-language telenovelas
Television shows set in Colombia